Yau Kin Wai (born 4 January 1973 in Hong Kong) is a former Hong Kong professional football player.

Club career
Yau had played for Hong Kong First Division League club South China for more than 10 years and is regarded as one of the most decorated defenders in Hong Kong. He had been voted as the Hong Kong Footballer of the Year in the 1998–99 season and had been voted as Hong Kong Top Footballers for 6 times.

He retired at the end of 2004–05 season.

Honours

Club
South China
Hong Kong First Division: 1996–97, 1999–2000
Hong Kong Senior Shield: 1995–96, 1996–97, 1998–99, 1999–2000, 2001–02, 2002–03
Hong Kong FA Cup: 1995–96, 1998–99, 2001–02

Individual
Hong Kong Footballer of the Year: 1999

Personal life
After retirement, Yau concentrated his career as a soccer commentator and in youth development. He is now a soccer commentator of Cable TV and mostly commentating Premier League matches.

External links
 Yau Soccer School

1973 births
Living people
Hong Kong footballers
Association football central defenders
Hong Kong First Division League players
South China AA players
Kitchee SC players
Hong Kong international footballers
Association football commentators
Footballers at the 1994 Asian Games
Footballers at the 1998 Asian Games
Footballers at the 2002 Asian Games
Asian Games competitors for Hong Kong
Hong Kong League XI representative players